Felix Widder may refer to:

Félix Bódog Widder (1874–1939), Hungarian painter, graphic designer, teacher
Felix Joseph Widder (1892–1974), Austrian mycologist and botanist